Oxley Park is a suburb of Sydney, in the state of New South Wales, Australia. It is 43 kilometres west of the Sydney central business district, in the local government area of the City of Penrith and is part of the Greater Western Sydney region.

History
Oxley Park was named after explorer John Oxley (1784–1828) was granted  in this area in 1823. The grant extended from Queen Street St Marys east to Ropes Creek and from the Great Western Highway to the railway line.

Land use
Oxley Park is a residential suburb. It is one of the older suburbs around St Marys, with older homes on large blocks of land. Its boundary includes Ropes Creek, the Great Western Highway, Sydney Street and the Main Western railway line.

Oxley Park features sporting fields, St Mary's Cemetery (the second-largest cemetery in the City of Penrith) and Oxley Park Primary School. There are no designated industrial areas in the suburb.

References

External links
 Penrith local suburb profiles

Suburbs of Sydney
City of Penrith